USS Lucid (AM-259) was an  built for the United States Navy during World War II. It was built to clear minefields in offshore waters, and served the Navy in the Atlantic Ocean.

Lucid was constructed by American Shipbuilding Co., Lorain, Ohio, on 20 February 1943; launched on 5 June 1943, sponsored by Mrs. Joseph S. Mood; and commissioned on 1 December 1943.

World War II Atlantic operations
After shakedown out of Little Creek, Virginia, Lucid departed on 3 March 1944 for the Caribbean, arriving at Guantánamo Bay on 7 March. For the next twelve months, the minesweeper was assigned to escort duty between Trinidad, British West Indies, and Recife, Brazil. Protecting convoys from U-boat attacks, she made eight such voyages prior to reporting for duty as a training ship at Miami on 28 March 1945.

From April to June, Lucid operated as a school ship out of Miami and trained future naval officers in the art of seamanship.

Decommissioning  
Following a brief overhaul at Norfolk, Virginia, the minesweeper returned to Miami, Florida, and decommissioned there on 28 August 1945.

She was transferred to the Republic of China as ROCS Yung Ting (AM-45). Her transfer to the Republic of China was made permanent on 12 March 1948, and Lucid was struck from the U.S. Naval Vessel Register the same day. In 1964, she was reclassified as a survey ship and renamed ROCS Yang Ming (AGS 362). She was decommissioned and struck from the Republic of China Navy on 1 July 1972. Her ultimate fate is unknown.

References

External links
 

Admirable-class minesweepers
Ships built in Lorain, Ohio
1943 ships
World War II minesweepers of the United States
Admirable-class minesweepers of the Republic of China Navy
Auxiliary ships of the Republic of China Navy